was a Japanese singer and guitarist born in Tokyo.

Profile
"Monsieur" was a founding member of bands The Spiders, Vodka Collins, and also a solo act.

In 2001 he had a reunion with some former members of The Spiders, as the band Sans Filtre. Among his recent work was his performance of the song "RTB", the ending song to the anime Sentou Yousei Yukikaze. He performed for over five decades.

Death
Kamayatsu died from pancreatic cancer on 1 March 2017, aged 78.

References

External links
 Spiders English language website
 Vodka Collins website
 

1939 births
2017 deaths
Musicians from Tokyo
Deaths from cancer in Japan
Deaths from pancreatic cancer